Room for Rent is a 2019 mystery-horror film written by Stuart Flack, directed by Tommy Stovall and starring Lin Shaye. The movie was produced by Pasidg Productions Inc. and distributed by Uncork'd Entertainment. Room for Rent was released on February 23, 2019, at the Sedona International Film Festival in Sedona, Arizona. The film concerns an aging widow who rents a room in her house in order to make some money. Things take a deadly turn when she becomes strangely obsessed with one of her new tenants.

Plot
Elderly housewife Joyce Smith (Lin Shaye) is left distraught after her husband Fred dies in a slip and fall accident while fixing the roof. Her probate attorney tells her that he owed a substantial amount of money on a loan, and apart from $2,200 in savings, he left no other assets in his name.

While in the library, Joyce notices a magazine that teaches homeowners how to turn their properties into a (bed and breakfast), and later converts her property. A young writer, Sarah, and her husband Edward become the first lodgers. Joyce bonds with Sarah but Edward is put off by her demeanour; they leave promptly but she and Sarah stay in touch via letters.

Soon after, a handsome young man named Bob moves into Joyce's house. She becomes infatuated with him, making special dinners, dressing up to impress him, and even gets a satellite dish so he can watch an all-football channel. After divorcing Edward, Sarah visits Joyce and shares an intimate night with Robert, causing a rift between herself and Joyce.

Joyce's neighbour Gladys tells Sarah she fell out with Joyce a while back due to her split-thinking and abandonment issues. Gladys also tells her that Fred forced Joyce to abort a baby. After Sarah leaves, Joyce visits Gladys and suffocates her with a pillow. When Bob asks Joyce where Sarah went, she lies and claims she has returned home to her husband, making Bob feel worthless. He later catches Joyce going through his belongings and confronts her; she tells him he reminds her of her son who passed away years ago. Bob accepts the lie but remains cautious.

Joyce makes Bob a home-cooked meal but spikes his food and then sexually assaults him while he is unconscious. She later finds money and cocaine in his belongings, suggesting he is a drug trafficker. After awakening, Bob finds a letter from Sarah, revealing Joyce's lies and manipulations. He confronts Joyce and then collects his belongings, intending to move out, but Joyce bludgeons him with a frying pan, killing him. She reads the rest of Sarah's letter to Bob, in which Sarah reveals that she is pregnant.

Joyce, who has always wanted a child, invites Sarah to stay at her home while Joyce takes a vacation using Bob's drug money. Joyce buries Bob's remains in the backyard and gets rid of his personal items. Sarah goes to Bob's old room but finds it locked. Unbeknownst to Sarah, Joyce has redesigned the room into a nursery, leaving behind a welcoming sign from grandma, foreboding her return after Sarah has given birth.

Cast
 Lin Shaye as Joyce
 Oliver Rayón as Robert
 Valeska Miller as Sarah
 Ryan Ochoa as Wayne
 Linda Cushma as Gladys
 Casey Nicholas Price as Edward
 Tonya June Moore as Sheila

Release

Reception
On review aggregator Rotten Tomatoes, Room for Rent has an approval rating of  based on  reviews. Frank Scheck of The Hollywood Reporter called it "essential viewing for Lin Shaye fans" and wrote: "The supporting characters are not nearly as well-developed or interesting, feeling more like plot devices and reducing the film's overall impact. And director Stovall (Aaron's Blood), although certainly competent, doesn't infuse the proceedings with the sort of cinematic stylishness that would have elevated Room for Rent above B-movie status. Nonetheless, it's essential viewing for Lin Shaye fans, and that's more than enough." Maria Lattila writing for the "Film Inquiry" told about the film: "Room For Rent is a lovely little thriller gem, a real diamond in the rough. It's not a class A film or cinema at its purest, but it explores some fascinating themes and one of Lin Shaye's best performances. Alex Saveliev from the online publication Film Threat gave the movie 7 out of 10 stars and stated: "Tommy Stoval's unpretentious descent into madness has a mercifully short running time. Fun and chilling, this bed-and-breakfast gets an extra star for its committed hostess.

References

External links
 
 

American mystery films
American horror thriller films
Films about stalking
2019 horror films
2019 films
2010s serial killer films
American serial killer films
Films about narcissism
2010s English-language films
2010s American films
2019 horror thriller films